Taren Stinebrickner-Kauffman (born 14 November 1981) is an Australian-American activist. She is the founder of SumOfUs, and served as the executive director until 2016. In March 2012, she and her group were active critics of working conditions at Apple Inc. supplier Foxconn. From 2020 until 2022, Taren served as president of New Media Ventures, a non-profit venture capital firm focused on progressive organizations.

Early life 
She is the daughter of DePauw University professors, former Georgetown basketball player Bruce Stinebrickner and author Kelsey Kauffman, the granddaughter of Rear Admiral Draper Kauffman and great granddaughter of Vice Admiral James L. Kauffman. She was raised in Greencastle, Indiana.

She graduated summa cum laude and Phi Beta Kappa with a degree in mathematics from Duke University in 2004.

Career

She has worked in social-impact technology, Democratic politics, consumer advocacy, corporate accountability, environmental advocacy, and the U.S. labor movement, including time with groups such as  Avaaz.org, the Alliance for Climate Protection, MoveOn.org, and the AFL-CIO. She founded SumOfUs in 2011, serving as Executive Director and growing the organization to 5 million members worldwide. She went on to serve as Senior Product Manager at Change.org, entrepreneur-in-residence at New Media Ventures, and then as the President of New Media Ventures starting in March 2022, leading the organization during the early phase of the COVID-19 pandemic and prioritizing work on voting rights and local media. She also serves on the board of Consumer Reports.

Personal life
She was the partner of Internet activist Aaron Swartz until his death. In 2011, Swartz was prosecuted by U.S. Attorney Carmen Ortiz for violations of the Computer Fraud and Abuse Act (CFAA), and, facing the risk of 50 years imprisonment and a million dollars in fines if he exercised his Sixth Amendment right to a public trial and was convicted, he died by suicide in 2013. She discovered his body.

References 

1981 births
Living people
Australian women activists
Duke University Trinity College of Arts and Sciences alumni
Internet activists
People from Brisbane
21st-century American women